The 1920 Five Nations Championship was the sixth series of the rugby union Five Nations Championship following the inclusion of France into the Home Nations Championship, and the first played since the 1914 Games due to World War I. Including the previous Home Nations Championships, this was the thirty-third series of the annual northern hemisphere rugby union championship. Ten matches were played between 1 January and 3 April. It was contested by England, France, Ireland, Scotland and Wales.

Table

Results

External links

1920
Five Nations
Five Nations
Five Nations
Five Nations
Five Nations
Five Nations
Five Nations Championship
Five Nations Championship
Five Nations Championship
Five Nations Championship